The 2018 Tuvalu A-Division was the 18th season of top flight association football in Tuvalu. The season started and finish on 2018.

References

External links 
 tnfa.tv
 vriendenvantuvalu.nl 
 soccerway.com

Tuvalu A-Division seasons